USNS Wally Schirra (T-AKE-8) is a Lewis and Clark-class dry cargo ship of the United States Navy, named in honor of Captain Wally Schirra (1923–2007), one of the Mercury Seven astronauts, who flew three times in space, on Mercury 8, Gemini 6A, and Apollo 7.

The contract to build Wally Schirra was awarded to National Steel and Shipbuilding Company (NASSCO) of San Diego, California, on 11 January 2005. Her keel was laid down on 14 April 2008, and she was launched and christened 8 March 2009 in a ceremony held at the NASSCO shipyard in San Diego. Serving as ship's sponsor, Josephine Schirra christened the ship in honor of her late husband.

Wally Schirra is the eighth ship of the Lewis and Clark class, and as part of Military Sealift Command's Naval Fleet Auxiliary Force, Wally Schirra is crewed by 124 civil service mariners and 11 Navy Sailors. The ship is designed to operate independently for extended periods at sea and can carry two helicopters and additional military personnel to conduct vertical replenishment.

References

External links

 

Lewis and Clark-class dry cargo ships
2009 ships
Wally Schirra